Lake Truesdale is a lake located in the hamlet of South Salem, part of the Town of Lewisboro, in northern Westchester County, New York. The primary water flow into the lake comes from the swamp on Pumping Station Road in Ridgefield, Connecticut.

The lake was created in 1927 by damming a stream and flooding Hoyt's pond and surrounding swamp. Two homeowners' associations (Truesdale Lake Property Owners' Association - TLPOA, and Truesdale Estates Association - TEA) manage the lake and maintain two beaches available to their members.

References

External links
 Truesdale Lake website
 Truesdale Lake Fact Sheet
 Truesdale Lake Fact Sheet alternate location

Lakes of Westchester County, New York
Lakes of New York (state)